Agriphila is a genus of small moths of the family Crambidae. It was first described by Jacob Hübner in 1825. They are common across temperate Eurasia and in adjacent regions.

Despite this genus being proposed as early as 1825, it was not widely recognized until the mid-20th century. Consequently, most species were initially placed in the closely related genus Crambus.

Species 
 Agriphila aeneociliella (Eversmann, 1844)
 Agriphila anceps (Grote, 1880)
 Agriphila argentea Bassi, 1999
 Agriphila argentistrigella (Ragonot in de Joannis & Ragonot, 1889)
 Agriphila atlantica (T. V. Wollaston, 1858)
 Agriphila attenuata (Grote, 1880)
 Agriphila beieri Błeszyński, 1955
 Agriphila biarmicus (Tengström, 1865)
 Agriphila biothanatalis (Hulst, 1886)
 Agriphila bleszynskiella Amsel, 1961
 Agriphila brioniella (Zerny, 1914) (=Agriphila vasilevi Ganev, 1983)
 Agriphila cernyi Ganev, 1985
 Agriphila costalipartella (Dyar, 1921)
 Agriphila cyrenaicella (Ragonot, 1887)
 Agriphila dalmatinella (Hampson, 1900)
 Agriphila deliella (Hübner, 1813)
 Agriphila geniculea (Haworth, 1811)
 Agriphila gerinella P. Leraut, 2012
 Agriphila hymalayensis Ganev, 1984
 Agriphila impurella (Hampson, 1896)
 Agriphila indivisella (Turati & Zanon, 1922) (=Agriphila reisseri Błeszyński, 1965)
 Agriphila inquinatella (Denis & Schiffermüller, 1775)
 Agriphila latistria (Haworth, 1811)
 Agriphila melike Kemal & Kocak, 2004 (replacement name for A. asiatica Ganev & Hacker, 1984)
 Agriphila microselasella Błeszyński, 1959
 Agriphila paleatella (Zeller, 1847)
 Agriphila plumbifimbriella (Dyar, 1904)
 Agriphila poliella (Treitschke, 1832)
 Agriphila ruricolella (Zeller, 1863) – lesser vagabond sod webworm moth
 Agriphila sakayehamana (Matsumura, 1925)
 Agriphila selasella (Hübner, 1813)
 Agriphila straminella (Denis & Schiffermüller, 1775)
 Agriphila tersella (Lederer, 1855)
 Agriphila tolli (Błeszyński, 1952)
 Agriphila trabeatella (Herrich-Schäffer, 1848)
 Agriphila tristella (Denis & Schiffermüller, 1775)
 Agriphila undata (Grote, 1881)
 Agriphila vulgivagella (Clemens, 1860) – vagabond crambus moth

Footnotes

References

External links 

 "Agriphila Hübner, 1825". Fauna Europaea. Retrieved November 28, 2017.

Crambini
Crambidae genera
Taxa named by Jacob Hübner